T1, T01, T.1 or T-1 may refer to:

Biology
 The first of the thoracic vertebrae in the vertebral column
 Thoracic spinal nerve 1, a nerve emerging from the vertebrae
 Cyclin T1, a human gene
 GalNAc-T1, a human gene
 Ribonuclease T1, a fungal endonuclease
 TNM staging system, classification for a small cancer tumor

Computing
 Apple T1, a system on a chip used by Apple
 T1 font, or cork encoding, a character encoding
 T1, a component of the T-carrier system for telecommunication
 UltraSPARC T1, a microprocessor

Transportation

Aircraft
 Raytheon T-1 Jayhawk, a jet aircraft used by the US Air Force for advanced pilot training
 Lockheed T2V SeaStar, a.k.a. T1 Seastar, a carrier-capable jet trainer in the US Navy
 Fuji T-1, Japan's first jet-powered trainer aircraft
 Sopwith Cuckoo, a British biplane torpedo bomber of 1918

Automobiles
 Bentley T-series, Bentley Motors model in the UK
 Caparo T1, a 2006 British sports car
 CWS T-1, first serially-built car manufactured in Poland
 Ford T1 platform, a large SUV automobile platform
 Mercedes-Benz T1, a 1977 van/truck also called a transporter
 Volkswagen Type 2 (T1), the first generation of Volkswagen transporter

Rail
 T series (Toronto subway), a subway car in Toronto, Canada
 North Shore & Western Line, a commuter rail line in Sydney, Australia
 Île-de-France tramway Line 1, a.k.a. T1, a tramway near Paris, France
 LSWR T1 class, an 1888 0-4-4T steam tank locomotives class
 Pennsylvania Railroad class T1, a 1942 4-4-4-4 steam locomotive class
 Reading T-1, a 1945 4-8-4 steam locomotive class
 LNER Class T1, a class of British steam locomotives 
 Tatra T1, a 1951 Czechoslovakian tramcar
 T1 (Istanbul Tram), a tram line in Istanbul, Turkey
 Nakano Station (Tokyo), station number T-01 in Tokyo Metro Tozai Line

Roads 
 T1 road (Zambia), a road in Zambia
 Tanzam Highway, designated T1 in Tanzania

Ships
 USS T-1, several United States Navy ships
 HMNZS Matai (T01), a Royal New Zealand Navy lighthouse tender of 1941
 MV Transpacific (T-1), a 1992 US oil tanker
 Yugoslav torpedo boat T1, a torpedo boat in the Yugoslav Navy, 1921–1941
 T1 tanker a mass-produced tanker used during and after World War II

Buses
 T1 Bristol–Thornbury, a bus route in England

Tanks and weapons
 T1 Light Tank, a U.S. prototype tank
 EE-T1 Osório, a 1985 Brazilian main battle tank
 AC NM AE T1 mine, a Brazilian anti-tank blast mine
 AP NM AE T1 mine, a Brazilian anti-personnel mine
 G7a torpedo, a WWII German torpedo

Mathematics, physics and chemistry
 T1 Aquarii, a star
 T1 Carinae, a star
 Soyuz T-1, a 1979 space mission
 T1 space, a topological space satisfying the T1 separation axiom
 , the 1-torus
 Spin–lattice relaxation time in nuclear magnetic resonance and magnetic resonance imaging

Products
 vivo T1 series, the 5 smartphones manufactured by Vivo Communication Technology Co.

Other uses
 T1 (album), 2018 album by Tatianna
 T1 (classification), a para-cycling classification
 T1 General, a tax form used in Canada
 T-1 visa, allowing victims of human trafficking to remain in the United States
 Tour T1, an office skyscraper in La Défense, Paris, France
 T1 Mall of Tallinn, shopping and entertainment centre in Tallinn, Estonia
 Estonian national road 1, officially T1, connecting Tallinn and Narva
 T1 (esports), Korean esports team.
 Target One, a Mesoamerican archaeological site in Honduras
 T1, a tornado intensity rating on the TORRO scale
 T+1, "trade date plus one day" in financial markets
 Tekken, a 1994 fighting game
 tyler1, an American internet personality and streamer on Twitch

See also
 1T (disambiguation)
 T (disambiguation)